Belén is a municipality in the Rivas department of Nicaragua with approximately 22,000 inhabitants.

References

Municipalities of the Rivas Department